Kwabena Okyere Darko-Mensah (born 18 June 1974 in Takoradi) is a Ghanaian politician and the current Member of Parliament for the  Takoradi constituency in the Western Region of Ghana. He had his secondary school at Mfantsipim School. He is a member of the New Patriotic Party (NPP) and the deputy minister for Aviation in Ghana.

Early life and education 
Darko-Mensah was born on 18 June 1974 in Takoradi. He hails from Anwhiankwanta, a town in (Ghana). He obtained his Bachelor of Science degree in biochemistry in 2000 from the Kwame Nkrumah University of Science and Technology. He later pursued a postgraduate degree in Democracy, Governance, Law and Development from the University of Cape Coast in 2006. He has also received certificates from Sangonet, South Africa, and Empretec Ghana.

Career 
Darko-Mensah is a biochemist and a hotelier by profession. From 1995 to 1998 he was in charge of operations management at the Ahenfie Hotel. From 2001 to 2006 he was with e-Base Africa Ltd as its managing director. He doubled as the Director of Operations at the Guest House Maggi from 2003 to 2008. He was also the finance committee chairman of the Sekondi- Takoradi metropolitan assembly, the third largest city of Ghana prior to entering parliament

Politics 
Darko-Mensah entered parliament on 7 January 2009 as a member of parliament for the Takoradi constituency on the ticket of the New Patriotic Party. He has remained in parliament winning the subsequent elections (2012 and 2016) since 2009.

Darko-Mensah was appointed deputy minister for Aviation in 2017 by Nana Akufo-Addo. He remained in that position until February 2019 when he was appointed Regional Minister for the Western Region.

In parliament, he has served on various committees, some of which include; the Subsidiary Legislation Committee, the Education Committee, the Business Committee and the Roads and Transport Committee.

Personal life 
Darko-Mensah is married with three children. He identifies as a Christian and a Methodist.

References 

Living people
New Patriotic Party politicians
Mfantsipim School alumni
Ghanaian MPs 2013–2017
Ghanaian MPs 2009–2013
Ghanaian MPs 2017–2021
People from Western Region (Ghana)
Government ministers of Ghana
Kwame Nkrumah University of Science and Technology alumni
University of Cape Coast alumni
Ghanaian MPs 2021–2025
1972 births